The Amazing Spider-Man is an ongoing American superhero comic book series featuring the Marvel Comics superhero Spider-Man as its title character and main protagonist. Being in the mainstream continuity of the franchise, it began publication in 1963 as a bimonthly periodical (as Amazing Fantasy had been), quickly being increased to monthly, and was published continuously, with a brief interruption in 1995, until its second volume with a new numbering order in 1999. In 2003, the series reverted to the numbering order of the first volume. The title has occasionally been published biweekly, and was published three times a month from 2008 to 2010.

After DC Comics' relaunch of Action Comics and Detective Comics with new No. 1 issues in 2011, it had been the highest-numbered American comic still in circulation until it was cancelled. The title ended its 50-year run as a continuously published comic with the landmark issue #700 in December 2012. It was replaced by The Superior Spider-Man as part of the Marvel NOW! relaunch of Marvel's comic lines.

Volume 3 of The Amazing Spider-Man was published in April 2014, following the conclusion of The Superior Spider-Man story arc. In late 2015, the series was relaunched with a 4th volume, following the 2015 Secret Wars event. The 5th volume began in 2018, as part of Marvel's Fresh Start series of comic relaunches. The 6th volume began in April 2022 to celebrate Spider-Man's 60th anniversary.

Publication history
Writer-editor Stan Lee and artist and co-plotter Steve Ditko created the character of Spider-Man, and the pair produced 38 issues from March 1963 to July 1966. Ditko left after the 38th issue, while Lee remained as writer until issue 100. Since then, many writers and artists have taken over the monthly comic through the years, chronicling the adventures of Marvel's most identifiable hero.

The Amazing Spider-Man has been the character's flagship series for his first fifty years in publication, and was the only monthly series to star Spider-Man until Peter Parker, The Spectacular Spider-Man, in 1976, although 1972 saw the debut of Marvel Team-Up, with the vast majority of issues featuring Spider-Man along with a rotating cast of other Marvel characters. Most of the major characters and villains of the Spider-Man saga have been introduced in Amazing, and with few exceptions, it is where most key events in the character's history have occurred. The title was published continuously until No. 441 (Nov. 1998) when Marvel Comics relaunched it as vol. 2 No. 1 (Jan. 1999), but on Spider-Man's 40th anniversary, this new title reverted to using the numbering of the original series, beginning again with issue No. 500 (Dec. 2003) and lasting until the final issue, No. 700 (Feb. 2013).

1960s
Due to strong sales on the character's first appearance in Amazing Fantasy No. 15, Spider-Man was given his own ongoing series in March 1963. The initial years of the series, under Lee and Ditko, chronicled Spider-Man's nascent career as a masked super-human vigilante with his civilian life as hard-luck yet perpetually good-humored and well-meaning teenager Peter Parker. Peter balanced his career as Spider-Man with his job as a freelance photographer for The Daily Bugle under the bombastic editor-publisher J. Jonah Jameson to support himself and his frail Aunt May. At the same time, Peter dealt with public hostility towards Spider-Man and the antagonism of his classmates Flash Thompson and Liz Allan at Midtown High School, while embarking on a tentative, ill-fated romance with Jameson's secretary, Betty Brant.

By focusing on Parker's everyday problems, Lee and Ditko created a groundbreakingly flawed, self-doubting superhero, and the first major teenaged superhero to be a protagonist and not a sidekick. Ditko's quirky art provided a stark contrast to the more cleanly dynamic stylings of Marvel's most prominent artist, Jack Kirby, and combined with the humor and pathos of Lee's writing to lay the foundation for what became an enduring mythos.

Most of Spider-Man's key villains and supporting characters were introduced during this time. Issue No. 1 (Mar. 1963) featured the first appearances of J. Jonah Jameson and his astronaut son John Jameson, and the supervillain the Chameleon. It included the hero's first encounter with the superhero team the Fantastic Four. Issue No. 2 (May 1963) featured the first appearance of the Vulture and the Tinkerer as well as the beginning of Parker's freelance photography career at the newspaper The Daily Bugle.

The Lee-Ditko era continued to usher in a significant number of villains and supporting characters, including Doctor Octopus in No. 3 (July 1963); the Sandman and Betty Brant in No. 4 (Sept. 1963); the Lizard in No. 6 (Nov. 1963); Living Brain in No. 8 (Jan. 1964); Electro in No. 9 (Mar. 1964); Mysterio in No. 13 (June 1964); the Green Goblin in No. 14 (July 1964); Kraven The Hunter in No. 15 (Aug. 1964); reporter Ned Leeds in No. 18 (Nov. 1964); and the Scorpion in No. 20 (Jan. 1965). The Molten Man was introduced in No. 28 (Sept. 1965) which also featured Parker's graduation from high school. Peter began attending Empire State University in No. 31 (Dec. 1965), which featured the first appearances of friends and classmates Gwen Stacy and Harry Osborn. Harry's father, Norman Osborn first appeared in No. 23 (April 1965) as a member of Jameson's country club but was not named nor revealed as Harry's father until No. 37 (June 1966).

One of the most celebrated issues of the Lee-Ditko run is No. 33 (Feb. 1966), the third part of the story arc "If This Be My Destiny...!", which features the dramatic scene of Spider-Man, through force of will and thoughts of family, escaping from being pinned by heavy machinery. Comics historian Les Daniels noted that "Steve Ditko squeezes every ounce of anguish out of Spider-Man's predicament, complete with visions of the uncle he failed and the aunt he has sworn to save." Peter David observed that "After his origin, this two-page sequence from Amazing Spider-Man No. 33 is perhaps the best-loved sequence from the Stan Lee/Steve Ditko era." Steve Saffel stated the "full page Ditko image from The Amazing Spider-Man No. 33 is one of the most powerful ever to appear in the series and influenced writers and artists for many years to come." and Matthew K. Manning wrote that "Ditko's illustrations for the first few pages of this Lee story included what would become one of the most iconic scenes in Spider-Man's history." The story was chosen as No. 15 in the 100 Greatest Marvels of All Time poll of Marvel's readers in 2001. Editor Robert Greenberger wrote in his introduction to the story that "These first five pages are a modern-day equivalent to Shakespeare as Parker's soliloquy sets the stage for his next action. And with dramatic pacing and storytelling, Ditko delivers one of the great sequences in all comics."

Although credited only as artist for most of his run, Ditko would eventually plot the stories as well as draw them, leaving Lee to script the dialogue. A rift between Ditko and Lee developed, and the two men were not on speaking terms long before Ditko completed his last issue, The Amazing Spider-Man No. 38 (July 1966). The exact reasons for the Ditko-Lee split have never been fully explained. Spider-Man successor artist John Romita Sr., in a 2010 deposition, recalled that Lee and Ditko "ended up not being able to work together because they disagreed on almost everything, cultural, social, historically, everything, they disagreed on characters..."

In successor penciler Romita Sr.'s first issue, No. 39 (Aug. 1966), nemesis the Green Goblin discovers Spider-Man's secret identity and reveals his own to the captive hero. Romita's Spider-Man – more polished and heroic-looking than Ditko's – became the model for two decades. The Lee-Romita era saw the introduction of such characters as Daily Bugle managing editor Robbie Robertson in No. 52 (Sept. 1967) and NYPD Captain George Stacy, father of Parker's girlfriend Gwen Stacy, in No. 56 (Jan. 1968). The most important supporting character to be introduced during the Romita era was Mary Jane Watson, who made her first full appearance in No. 42 (Nov. 1966), although she first appeared in No. 25 (June 1965) with her face obscured and had been mentioned since No. 15 (Aug. 1964). Peter David wrote in 2010 that Romita "made the definitive statement of his arrival by pulling Mary Jane out from behind the oversized potted plant [that blocked the reader's view of her face in issue #25] and placing her on panel in what would instantly become an iconic moment." Romita has stated that in designing Mary Jane, he "used Ann-Margret from the movie Bye Bye Birdie as a guide, using her coloring, the shape of her face, her red hair and her form-fitting short skirts."

Lee and Romita toned down the prevalent sense of antagonism in Parker's world by improving Parker's relationship with the supporting characters and having stories focused as much on the social and college lives of the characters as they did on Spider-Man's adventures. The stories became more topical, addressing issues such as civil rights, racism, prisoners' rights, the Vietnam War, and political elections.

Issue No. 50 (June 1967) introduced the highly enduring criminal mastermind the Kingpin, who would become a major force as well in the superhero series Daredevil. Other notable first appearances in the Lee-Romita era include the Rhino in No. 41 (Oct. 1966), the Shocker in No. 46 (Mar. 1967), the Prowler in No. 78 (Nov. 1969), and the Kingpin's son, Richard Fisk, in No. 83 (Apr. 1970).

1970s

Several spin-off series debuted in the 1970s: Marvel Team-Up in 1972, and The Spectacular Spider-Man in 1976. A short-lived series titled Giant-Size Spider-Man began in July 1974 and ran six issues through 1975. Spidey Super Stories, a series aimed at children ages 6–10, ran for 57 issues from October 1974 through 1982.
The flagship title's second decade took a grim turn with a story in #89-90 (Oct.-Nov. 1970) featuring the death of Captain George Stacy. This was the first Spider-Man story to be penciled by Gil Kane, who would alternate drawing duties with Romita for the next year-and-a-half and would draw several landmark issues.

One such story took place in the controversial issues #96–98 (May–July 1971). Writer-editor Lee defied the Comics Code Authority with this story, in which Parker's friend Harry Osborn, was hospitalized after over-dosing on pills. Lee wrote this story upon a request from the U. S. Department of Health, Education, and Welfare for a story about the dangers of drugs. Citing its dictum against depicting drug use, even in an anti-drug context, the CCA refused to put its seal on these issues. With the approval of Marvel publisher Martin Goodman, Lee had the comics published without the seal. The comics sold well and Marvel won praise for its socially conscious efforts. The CCA subsequently loosened the Code to permit negative depictions of drugs, among other new freedoms.

"The Six Arms Saga" of #100–102 (Sept.–Nov. 1971) introduced Morbius, the Living Vampire. The second installment was the first Amazing Spider-Man story not written by co-creator Lee, with Roy Thomas taking over writing the book for several months before Lee returned to write #105–110 (Feb.-July 1972). Lee, who was going on to become Marvel Comics' publisher, with Thomas becoming editor-in-chief, then turned writing duties over to 19-year-old Gerry Conway, who scripted the series through 1975. Romita penciled Conway's first half-dozen issues, which introduced the gangster Hammerhead in No. 113 (Oct. 1972). Kane then succeeded Romita as penciler, although Romita would continue inking Kane for a time.

Issue 121 (June 1973 by Conway-Kane-Romita) featured the death of Gwen Stacy at the hands of the Green Goblin in "The Night Gwen Stacy Died." Her demise and the Goblin's apparent death one issue later formed a story arc widely considered as the most defining in the history of Spider-Man. The aftermath of the story deepened both the characterization of Mary Jane Watson and her relationship with Parker.

In 1973 Gil Kane was succeeded by Ross Andru, whose run lasted from issue  #125 (Oct. 1973) to #185 (Oct. 1978). Issue#129 (Feb. 1974) introduced the Punisher, who would become one of Marvel Comics' most popular characters. The Conway-Andru era featured the first appearances of the Man-Wolf in #124–125 (Sept.-Oct. 1973); the near-marriage of Doctor Octopus and Aunt May in #131 (Apr. 1974); Harry Osborn stepping into his father's role as the Green Goblin in #135–137 (Aug.-Oct.1974); and the original "Clone Saga", containing the introduction of Spider-Man's clone, in #147–149 (Aug.-Oct. 1975).

Archie Goodwin and Gil Kane produced the title's 150th issue (Nov. 1975) before Len Wein became writer with issue #151. During Wein's tenure, Harry Osborn and Liz Allen dated and became engaged; J. Jonah Jameson was introduced to his eventual second wife, Marla Madison; and Aunt May suffered a heart attack. Wein's last story on Amazing was a five-issue arc in #176–180 (Jan.-May 1978) featuring a third Green Goblin (Harry Osborn's psychiatrist, Bart Hamilton).

Marv Wolfman, Marvel's editor-in-chief from 1975 to 1976, succeeded Wein as writer and, in his first issue, #182 (July 1978), had Parker propose marriage to Watson, who refused in the following issue. Keith Pollard succeeded Andru as artist shortly afterward and, with Wolfman, introduced the likable rogue the Black Cat (Felicia Hardy) in #194 (July 1979). As a love interest for Spider-Man, the Black Cat would go on to be an important supporting character for the better part of the next decade and remain a friend and occasional lover into the 2010s.

1980s

The Amazing Spider-Man #200 (Jan. 1980) featured the return and death of the burglar who killed Spider-Man's Uncle Ben. Writer Marv Wolfman and penciler Keith Pollard both left the title by mid-year, succeeded by Dennis O'Neil, a writer known for groundbreaking 1970s work at rival DC Comics, and penciler John Romita Jr. O'Neil wrote two issues of The Amazing Spider-Man Annual which were both drawn by Frank Miller. The 1980 Annual featured a team-up with Doctor Strange while the 1981 Annual showcased a meeting with the Punisher. Roger Stern, who had written nearly 20 issues of sister title The Spectacular Spider-Man, took over Amazing with #224 (Jan. 1982). During his two years on the title, Stern augmented the backgrounds of long-established Spider-Man villains and, with Romita Jr., created the mysterious supervillain the Hobgoblin in #238–239 (Mar.–Apr. 1983). Fans engaged with the mystery of the Hobgoblin's secret identity, which continued throughout #244–245 and 249–251 (Sept.-Oct. 1983 and Feb.-April 1984). One lasting change was the reintroduction of Mary Jane Watson as a more serious, mature woman who becomes Peter's confidante after she reveals that she knows his secret identity.  Stern also wrote "The Kid Who Collects Spider-Man" in The Amazing Spider-Man  #248 (Jan. 1984), a story which ranks among his most popular.

By mid-1984, Tom DeFalco and Ron Frenz took over scripting and penciling. DeFalco helped establish Parker and Watson's mature relationship, laying the foundation for the characters' wedding in 1987. Notably, in #257 (Oct. 1984), Watson tells Parker that she knows he is Spider-Man, and in #259 (Dec. 1984), she reveals to Parker the extent of her troubled childhood. Other notable issues of the DeFalco-Frenz era include #252 (May 1984), the first appearance of Spider-Man's black costume, which the hero would wear almost exclusively for the next four years' worth of comics; the debut of criminal mastermind the Rose in #253 (June 1984); the revelation in #258 (Nov. 1984) that the black costume is a living being, a symbiote; and the introduction of the female mercenary Silver Sable in #265 (June 1985).

DeFalco and Frenz were both removed from The Amazing Spider-Man in 1986 by editor Jim Owsley under acrimonious circumstances. A succession of artists including Alan Kupperberg, John Romita Jr., and Alex Saviuk penciled the series from 1987 to 1988, and Owsley wrote the book for the first half of 1987, scripting the five-part "Gang War" story (#284–288) that DeFalco plotted. Former Spectacular Spider-Man writer Peter David scripted #289 (June 1987), which revealed Ned Leeds as being the Hobgoblin although this was retconned in 1996 by Roger Stern into Leeds not being the original Hobgoblin after all.

David Michelinie took over as writer in the next issue, for a story arc in #290–292 (July–Sept. 1987) that led to the marriage of Peter Parker and Mary Jane Watson in Amazing Spider-Man Annual No. 21. The "Kraven's Last Hunt" storyline by writer J.M. DeMatteis and artists Mike Zeck and Bob McLeod crossed over into The Amazing Spider-Man #293 and 294. Issue #298 (Mar. 1988) was the first Spider-Man comic to be drawn by future industry star Todd McFarlane, the first regular artist on The Amazing Spider-Man since Frenz's departure. McFarlane revolutionized Spider-Man's look. His depiction – "Ditko-esque" poses, large eyes; wiry, contorted limbs; and messy, knotted, convoluted webbing – influenced the way virtually all subsequent artists would draw the character. McFarlane's other significant contribution to the Spider-Man canon was the design for what would become one of Spider-Man's most wildly popular antagonists, the supervillain Venom. Issue #299 (Apr. 1988) featured Venom's first appearance (a last-page cameo) before his first full appearance in #300 (May 1988). The latter issue featured Spider-Man reverting to his original red-and-blue costume.

Other notable issues of the Michelinie-McFarlane era include #312 (Feb. 1989), featuring the Green Goblin vs. the Hobgoblin; and #315–317 (May–July 1989), with the return of Venom. In July 2012, Todd McFarlane's original cover art for The Amazing Spider-Man No. 328 sold for a bid of $657,250, making it the most expensive American comic book art ever sold at auction.

1990s
With a civilian life as a married man, the Spider-Man of the 1990s was different from the superhero of the previous three decades. McFarlane left the title in 1990 to write and draw a new series titled simply Spider-Man. His successor, Erik Larsen, penciled the book from early 1990 to mid-1991. After issue No. 350, Larsen was succeeded by Mark Bagley, who had won the 1986 Marvel Tryout Contest and was assigned a number of low-profile penciling jobs followed by a run on New Warriors in 1990. Bagley penciled the flagship Spider-Man title from 1991 to 1996. During that time, Bagley's rendition of Spider-Man was used extensively for licensed material and merchandise.

Issues #361–363 (April–June 1992) introduced Carnage, a second symbiote nemesis for Spider-Man. The series' 30th-anniversary issue, No. 365 (Aug. 1992), was a double-sized, hologram-cover issue with the cliffhanger ending of Peter Parker's parents, long thought dead, reappearing alive. It would be close to two years before they were revealed to be impostors, who are killed in No. 388 (April 1994), scripter Michelinie's last issue. His 1987–1994 stint gave him the second-longest run as writer on the title, behind Stan Lee.

Issue No. 375 was released with a gold foil cover. There was an error affecting some issues and which are missing the majority of the foil.

With No. 389, writer J. M. DeMatteis, whose Spider-Man credits included the 1987 "Kraven's Last Hunt" story arc and a 1991–1993 run on The Spectacular Spider-Man, took over the title. From October 1994 to June 1996, Amazing stopped running stories exclusive to it, and ran installments of multi-part stories that crossed over into all the Spider-Man books. One of the few self-contained stories during this period was in No. 400 (April 1995), which featured the death of Aunt May – later revealed to have been faked (although the death still stands in the MC2 continuity). The "Clone Saga" culminated with the revelation that the Spider-Man who had appeared in the previous 20 years of comics was a clone of the real Spider-Man. This plot twist was massively unpopular with many readers, and was later reversed in the "Revelations" story arc that crossed over the Spider-Man books in late 1996.

The Clone Saga tied into a publishing gap after No. 406 (Oct. 1995), when the title was temporarily replaced by The Amazing Scarlet Spider #1–2 (Nov.-Dec. 1995), featuring Ben Reilly. The series picked up again with No. 407 (Jan. 1996), with Tom DeFalco returning as writer. Bagley completed his 5½-year run by September 1996. A succession of artists, including Ron Garney, Steve Skroce, Joe Bennett, Rafael Kayanan and John Byrne penciled the book until the final issue, No. 441 (Nov. 1998), after which Marvel rebooted the title with vol. 2, No. 1 (Jan. 1999).

Relaunch and the 2000s
Marvel began The Amazing Spider-Man relaunching the 'Amazing' comic book series with (vol. 2) #1 (Jan. 1999). Howard Mackie wrote the first 29 issues. The relaunch included the Sandman being regressed to his criminal ways and the "death" of Mary Jane, which was ultimately reversed. Other elements included the introduction of a new Spider-Woman (who was spun off into her own short-lived series) and references to John Byrne's miniseries Spider-Man: Chapter One, which was launched at the same time as the reboot. Byrne also penciled issues #1–18 (from 1999 to 2000) and wrote #13–14, John Romita Jr. took his place soon after in October 2000. Mackie's run ended with The Amazing Spider-Man Annual 2001, which saw the return of Mary Jane, who then left Parker upon reuniting with him.

With issue #30 (June 2001), J. Michael Straczynski took over as writer and oversaw additional storylines – most notably his lengthy "Spider-Totem" arc, which raised the issue of whether Spider-Man's powers were magic-based, rather than as the result of a radioactive spider's bite. Additionally, Straczynski resurrected the plot point of Aunt May discovering her nephew was Spider-Man, and returned Mary Jane, with the couple reuniting in The Amazing Spider-Man (vol. 2) #50. Straczynski gave Spider-Man a new profession, having Parker teach at his former high school.

Issue #30 began a dual numbering system, with the original series numbering (#471) returned and placed alongside the volume two number on the cover. Other longtime, rebooted Marvel Comics titles, including Fantastic Four, likewise were given the dual numbering around this time. After (vol. 2) #58 (Nov. 2003), the title reverted completely to its original numbering for issue #500 (Dec. 2003). Mike Deodato, Jr. penciled the series from mid-2004 until 2006.

That year Peter Parker revealed his Spider-Man identity on live television in the company-crossover storyline "Civil War", in which the superhero community is split over whether to conform to the federal government's new Superhuman Registration Act. This knowledge was erased from the world with the event of the four-part, crossover story arc, "One More Day", written partially by J. Michael Straczynski and illustrated by Joe Quesada, running through The Amazing Spider-Man #544–545 (Nov.-Dec. 2007), Friendly Neighborhood Spider-Man No. 24 (Nov. 2007) and The Sensational Spider-Man No. 41 (Dec. 2007), the final issues of those two titles. Here, the demon Mephisto makes a Faustian bargain with Parker and Mary Jane, offering to save Parker's dying Aunt May if the couple will allow their marriage to have never existed, rewriting that portion of their pasts. This story arc marked the end of Straczynski's work on the title.

Following this, Marvel made The Amazing Spider-Man the company's sole Spider-Man title, increasing its frequency of publication to three issues monthly, and inaugurating the series with a sequence of "back to basics" story arcs under the banner of "Brand New Day". Parker now exists in a changed world where he and Mary Jane had never married, and Parker has no memory of being married to her, with domino effect differences in their immediate world. The most notable of these revisions to Spider-Man continuity are the return of Harry Osborn, whose death in The Spectacular Spider-Man No. 200 (May 1993) is erased; and the reestablishment of Spider-Man's secret identity, with no one except Mary Jane able to recall that Parker is Spider-Man (although he soon reveals his secret identity to the New Avengers and the Fantastic Four). Under the banner of Brand New Day, Marvel tried to only use newly created villains instead of relying on older ones. Characters like Mister Negative and Overdrive both in Free Comic Book Day 2007 Spider-Man (July 2007), Menace in No. 549 (March 2008),  Ana and Sasha Kravinoff in No. 565 (September 2008) and  No. 567 (October 2008) respectively, and several more were introduced. The alternating regular writers were initially Dan Slott, Bob Gale, Marc Guggenheim,  and Zeb Wells, joined by a rotation of artists that included Steve McNiven, Salvador Larroca, Phil Jimenez, Barry Kitson, Chris Bachalo, Mike McKone, Marcos Martín, and John Romita Jr. Joe Kelly, Mark Waid, Fred Van Lente and Roger Stern later joined the writing team and Paolo Rivera, Lee Weeks and Marco Checchetto the artist roster. Waid's work on the series included a meeting between Spider-Man and Stephen Colbert in The Amazing Spider-Man No. 573 (Dec. 2008).
Issue No. 583 (March 2009) included a back-up story in which Spider-Man meets President Barack Obama.

2010s and temporary end of publication
Mark Waid scripted the opening of "The Gauntlet" storyline in issue No. 612 (Jan. 2010). The Gauntlet story was concluded by Grim Hunt (No. 634-637) which saw the resurrection of long-dead Spider-Man villain, Kraven the Hunter. The series became a twice-monthly title with Dan Slott as sole writer at issue No. 648 (Jan. 2011), launching the Big Time storyline. Eight additional pages were added per issue. Big Time saw major changes in Spider-Man/Peter Parker's life, Peter would start working at Horizon Labs and begin a relationship with Carlie Cooper (his first serious relationship since his marriage to Mary Jane), Mac Gargan returned as Scorpion after spending the past few years as Venom, Phil Urich would take up the mantle of Hobgoblin, and the death of J. Jonah Jameson's wife, Marla Jameson. Issues 654 and 654.1 saw the birth of Agent Venom, Flash Thompson bonded with the Venom symbiote, which would lead to Venom getting his own series Venom (volume 2). Starting in No. 659 and going to No. 655, the series built-up to the Spider-Island event which officially started in No. 666 and ended in No. 673. Ends of the Earth was the next event that ran from No. 682 through No. 687. This publishing format lasted until issue No. 700, which concluded the "Dying Wish" storyline, in which Parker and Doctor Octopus swapped bodies, and the latter taking on the mantle of Spider-Man when Parker apparently died in Doctor Octopus' body. The Amazing Spider-Man ended with this issue, with the story continuing in the new series The Superior Spider-Man. Despite The Superior Spider-Man being considered a different series to The Amazing Spider-Man, the first 33 issue run goes towards the legacy numbering of The Amazing Spider-Man acting as issues 701–733. In December 2013, the series returned for five issues, numbered 700.1 through 700.5, with the first two written by David Morrell and drawn by Klaus Janson.

2014 relaunch
In January 2014, Marvel confirmed that The Amazing Spider-Man would be relaunched on April 30, 2014, starting from issue No. 1, with Peter Parker as Spider-Man once again.
The first issue of this new version of The Amazing Spider-Man was, according to Diamond Comics Distributors, the "best-selling comic book... in over a decade."
Issues #1–6 were a story arc called "Lucky to be Alive", taking place immediately after "Goblin Nation", with issues No. 4 and No. 5 being a crossover with the Original Sin storyline. Issue No. 4 introduced Silk, a new heroine who was bitten by the same spider as Peter Parker. Issues #7–8 featured a team-up between Ms. Marvel and Spider-Man, and had backup stories that tied into "Edge of Spider-Verse". The next major plot arc, titled "Spider-Verse", began in Issue No. 9 and ended in No. 15, features every Spider-Man from across the dimensions being hunted by Morlun, and a team-up to stop him, with Peter Parker of Earth-616 in command of the Spider-Men's Alliance. The Amazing Spider-Man Annual No. 1 of the relaunched series was released in December 2014, featuring stories unrelated to "Spider-Verse".

The Amazing Spider-Man: Renew Your Vows
In 2015, Marvel started the universe wide Secret Wars event where the core and several other Marvel universes were combined into one big planet called Battleworld. Battleworld was divided into sections with most of them being self-contained universes. Marvel announced that several of these self-contained universes would get their own tie in series and one of them was Amazing Spider-Man: Renew Your Vows, an alternate universe where Peter Parker and Mary Jane are still married and give birth to their child Annie May Parker, written by Dan Slott. Despite the series being considered separate from the main Amazing Spider-Man series, the original 5 issue run is counted towards its legacy numbering acting as No. 752-756.

2015 relaunch
Following the 2015 Secret Wars event, a number of Spider-Man-related titles were either relaunched or created as part of the "All-New, All-Different Marvel" event. Among them, The Amazing Spider-Man was relaunched as well and primarily focused on Peter Parker continuing to run Parker Industries and becoming a successful businessman operating worldwide. It also tied with Civil War II (involving an Inhuman named Ulysses Cain who can predict possible futures), Dead No More (where Ben Reilly [the original Scarlet Spider] revealed to be revived and as one of the antagonists instead), and Secret Empire (during Hydra's reign led by a Hydra influenced Captain America/Steve Rogers, and the dismissal of Parker Industries by Peter Parker to stop Otto Octavius). Starting in September 2017, Marvel started the Marvel Legacy event which renumbered several Marvel series to their original numbering. The Amazing Spider-Man was put back to its original numbering for #789. Issues #789 through 791 focused on the aftermath of Peter destroying Parker Industries and his fall from grace. Issues #792 and 793 were part of the Venom Inc. story. Threat Level: Red was the story for the next three issues which saw Norman Osborn obtain and bond with the Carnage symbiote. Go Down Swinging saw the results of the combination of Osborn's goblin serum and Carnage symbiote creating the Red Goblin. Issue #801 was Dan Slott's goodbye issue.

2018 relaunch
In March 2018, it was announced that writer Nick Spencer would be writing the main semi-monthly The Amazing Spider-Man series beginning with a new No. 1, replacing long-time writer Dan Slott, as part of the Fresh Start relaunch that July.
The first five-issue story arc was titled 'Back to Basics.' During the Back to Basics story, Kindred, a mysterious villain with some relation to Peter's past, was introduced, and Peter resumed his romantic relationship with Mary Jane once more. The first major story under Spencer was Hunted which ran through issues 16 through 23, the story also included four ".HU" issues for issues 16, 18, 19, and 20. The end of the story saw the death of long-running Spider-Man villain Kraven the Hunter, being replaced by his clone son, The Last Son of Kraven.

2020s

Issue 45 kicked off the Sins Rising story which saw the resurrected Sin-Eater carry out the plans of Kindred to cleanse the world of sin, particularly that of Norman Osborn. The story concluded with issue 49, issue 850 in legacy numbering, seeing Spider-Man and Green Goblin team up to defeat Sin-Eater. Last Remains started in issue 50 and concluded in issue 55, the story saw Kindred's plans come to fruition as he tormented Spider-Man. The story has also saw five ".LR" for issues 50, 51, 52, 53, and 54 which focused on The Order of the Web, a new faction of Spider-People consisting of Julia Carpenter (Madame Web), Miles Morales (Spider-Man), Gwen Stacy (Ghost-Spider), Cindy Moon (Silk), Jessica Drew (Spider-Woman), and Anya Corazon (Spider-Girl) . The story also revealed that Kindred is Harry Osborn. Last Remains also received two fallout issues called Last Remains Post-Mortem.

Nick Spencer concluded his run with the Sinister War story which wrapped up in No. 74 (legacy numbering 875). The story saw several retcons to the Spider-Man mythos including that Kindred was Gabriel and Sarah Stacy all along, the fact that the Stacy twins were actually genetically engineered beings using Norman Osborn and Gwen Stacy's DNA, that the Harry Osborn that returned in Brand New Day was actually a clone, and that Norman had made a deal with Mephisto where he sold Harry's soul to the demon. The story ended with the deaths of the Harry clone, Gabriel, and Sarah and the real Harry's soul being freed from Mephisto's grasp.

After Spencer left the book, Marvel announced the "Beyond" era of Spider-Man would start in #75. The book would be moving back to the format it had during Brand New Day where it would have a rotating cast of writers including Kelly Thompson, Saladin Ahmed, Cody Ziglar, Patrick Gleason, and Zeb Wells. The book would also be released three times a month. "Beyond" would focus on Ben Reilly taking up the mantle of Spider-Man once again but backed by the Beyond corporation. Peter also falls ill and cannot be Spider-Man so he gives Ben his blessing to carry on as the main Spider-Man. However, following the conclusion of the storyline in #93, Peter has resumed active duties as Spider-Man, while Ben suffers a mental breakdown and becomes the villain Chasm.

2022 relaunch
In January 2022, it was announced that writer Zeb Wells and John Romita Jr. would be working on a relaunched The Amazing Spider-Man, bringing the number of volumes for the title to its sixth, with the series beginning in April 2022.  The relaunch encompasses both a legacy numbering of #900 as well as the 60th anniversary for the character. It will also have a crossover event, entitled Dark Web, with Chasm having teamed up with Madelyne Pryor to bring limbo to Earth.

Collected editions
Black-and-white
 Essential Spider-Man Vol. 1 [#1–20, Annual #1; Amazing Fantasy #15]
 Essential Spider-Man Vol. 2 [#21–43, Annual #2–3]
 Essential Spider-Man Vol. 3 [#44–65, Annual #4]
 Essential Spider-Man Vol. 4 [#66–89, Annual #5]
 Essential Spider-Man Vol. 5 [#90–113]
 Essential Spider-Man Vol. 6 [#114–137; Giant-Size Super Heroes #1; Giant-Size Spider-Man #1–2]
 Essential Spider-Man Vol. 7 [#138–160, Annual #10; Giant-Size Spider-Man #4–5]
 Essential Spider-Man Vol. 8 [#161–185, Annual #11; Giant-Size Spider-Man #6; Nova #12]
 Essential Spider-Man Vol. 9 [#186–210, Annual #13–14; Peter Parker: Spectacular Spider-Man Annual #1]
 Essential Spider-Man Vol. 10 [#211–230, Annual #15]
 Essential Spider-Man Vol. 11 [#231–248, Annual #16–17]

Major story arcs/artist runs
 Marvel Visionaries: John Romita Sr. [#39–40, 42, 50, 108–109, 365; Daredevil #16–17; Untold Tales of Spider-Man #-1]
 Spider-Man: The Death of Captain Stacy [#88–90]
 Spider-Man: The Death of Gwen Stacy [#96–98, 121–122; Webspinners: Tales of Spider-Man #1]
 Spider-Man: Death of the Stacys [#88–92, 121–122]
 A New Goblin [#176–180]
 Spider-Man vs. the Black Cat [#194–195, 204–205, 226–227]
 Spider-Man: Origin of The Hobgoblin [#238–239, 244–245, 249–251, Spectacular Spider-Man (vol. 1) #85]
 Spider-Man: Birth of Venom [#252–259, 298–300, 315–317, Annual #25; Fantastic Four #274; Secret Wars #8; Web of Spider-Man #1]
 The Amazing Spider-Man: The Wedding [#290–292, Annual #2, Not Brand Echh #6]
 Spider-Man: Kraven's Last Hunt [#293–294; Web of Spider-Man #31–32; The Spectacular Spider-Man #131–132]
 Visionaries: Todd McFarlane [#298–305]
 Legends, Vol. 2: Todd McFarlane [#306–314; The Spectacular Spider-Man Annual #10]
 Legends, Vol. 3: Todd McFarlane [#315–323, 325, 328]
 Spider-Man: Venom Returns [#330–333, 344–347;Annual #25]
 Spider-Man: Carnage [#344–345, 359–363]
Collections
 Vol. 1: Coming Home [#30-35/471-476]
 Vol. 2: Revelations [#36-39/477-480]
 Vol. 3: Until the Stars Turn Cold [#40-45/481-486]
 Vol. 4: The Life and Death of Spiders [#46-50/487-491]
 Vol. 5: Unintended Consequences [#51-56/492-497]
 Vol. 6: Happy Birthday [#57–58,500-502/498-502]
 Vol. 7: The Book of Ezekiel [#503–508]
 Vol. 8: Sins Past [#509–514]
 Vol. 9: Skin Deep [#515–518]
 Vol. 10: New Avengers [#519–524]
 Spider-Man: The Other [#525–528; Friendly Neighborhood Spider-Man #1–4; Marvel Knights Spider-Man #19–22]
 Civil War: The Road to Civil War [#529–531; New Avengers: Illuminati (one-shot); Fantastic Four #536–537]
 Vol. 11: Civil War [#532–538]
 Vol. 12: Back in Black [#539–543; Friendly Neighborhood Spider-Man #17–23, Annual #1]
 Spider-Man: One More Day [#544–545; Friendly Neighborhood Spider-Man #24; The Sensational Spider-Man #41; Marvel Spotlight: Spider-Man – One More Day/Brand New Day]
 Brand New Day Vol. 1 [#546–551; The Amazing Spider-Man: Swing Shift (Director's Cut); Venom Super-Special]
 Brand New Day Vol. 2 [#552–558]
 Brand New Day Vol. 3 [#559–563]
 Kraven's First Hunt [#564–567; The Amazing Spider-Man: Extra! #1 (story #2)]
 New Ways to Die [#568–573; Marvel Spotlight: Spider-Man – Brand New Day]
 Crime and Punisher [#574–577; The Amazing Spider-Man: Extra! #1 (story #1)]
 Death and Dating [#578–583, Annual #35/1]
 Election Day [#584–588; The Amazing Spider-Man: Extra! #1 (story #3), 3 (story #1); The Amazing Spider-Man Presidents' Day Special]
 24/7 [#589–594; The Amazing Spider-Man: Extra! #2]
 American Son [#595–599; material from The Amazing Spider-Man: Extra! #3]
 Died in Your Arms Tonight [#600–601, Annual #36; material from Amazing Spider-Man Family #7]
 Red-Headed Stranger [#602–605]
 Return of the Black Cat [#606–611; material from Web of Spider-Man (vol. 2) #1]
 The Gauntlet Book 1: Electro and Sandman [#612–616; Dark Reign: The List – The Amazing Spider-Man; Web of Spider-Man (vol. 2) #2 (Electro story)]
 The Gauntlet Book 2: Rhino and Mysterio [#617–621; Web of Spider-Man (vol. 2) #3–4]
 The Gauntlet Book 3: Vulture and Morbius [#622–625; Web of Spider-Man (vol. 2) #2, 5 (Vulture story)]
 The Gauntlet Book 4: Juggernaut [#229–230, 626–629]
 The Gauntlet Book 5: Lizard [#629–633; Web of Spider-Man (vol. 2) #6]
 Spider-Man: Grim Hunt [#634–637; The Amazing Spider-Man: Extra! #3; Spider-Man: Grim Hunt – The Kraven Saga; Web of Spider-Man (vol. 2) #7]
 One Moment in Time [#638–641]
 Origin of the Species [#642–647; Spider-Man Saga; Web of Spider-Man (vol. 2) #12]
 Big Time [#648–651]
 Matters of Life and Death [#652–657, 654.1]
 Spider-Man: The Fantastic Spider-Man [#658–662]
 Spider-Man: The Return Of Anti-Venom [#663–665; Free Comic Book Day 2011: Spider-Man]
 Spider-Man: Spider-Island [#666–673; Venom (2011) #6–8, Spider-Island: Deadly Foes; Infested prologues from #659–660 and 662–665]
 Spider-Man: Flying Blind [#674–677; Daredevil #8]
 Spider-Man: Trouble on the Horizon [#678–681, 679.1]
 Spider-Man: Ends of the Earth [#682–687; Amazing Spider-Man: Ends of the Earth #1; Avenging Spider-Man #8]
 Spider-Man: Lizard – No Turning Back [#688–691; Untold Tales of Spider-Man #9]
 Spider-Man: Danger Zone [#692–697; Avenging Spider-Man #11]
 Spider-Man: Dying Wish [#698–700]
 The Amazing Spider-Man Omnibus Vol. 1 [#1–38, Annual #1–2; Amazing Fantasy #15; Strange Tales Annual #2; Fantastic Four Annual #1]
 The Amazing Spider-Man Omnibus Vol. 2 [#39–67, Annual #3–5; Spectacular Spider-Man #1–2]
 Marvel Masterworks: The Amazing Spider-Man Vol. 1 [#1–10; Amazing Fantasy #15]
 Marvel Masterworks: The Amazing Spider-Man Vol. 2 [#11–19, Annual #1]
 Marvel Masterworks: The Amazing Spider-Man Vol. 3 [#20–30, Annual #2]
 Marvel Masterworks: The Amazing Spider-Man Vol. 4 [#31–40]
 Marvel Masterworks: The Amazing Spider-Man Vol. 5 [#41–50, Annual #3]
 Marvel Masterworks: The Amazing Spider-Man Vol. 6 [#51–61, Annual #4]
 Marvel Masterworks: The Amazing Spider-Man Vol. 7 [#62–67, Annual #5; The Spectacular Spider-Man #1–2 (magazine)]
 Marvel Masterworks: The Amazing Spider-Man Vol. 8 [#68–77; Marvel Super Heroes #14]
 Marvel Masterworks: The Amazing Spider-Man Vol. 9 [#78–87]
 Marvel Masterworks: The Amazing Spider-Man Vol. 10 [#88–99]
 Marvel Masterworks: The Amazing Spider-Man Vol. 11 [#100–109]
 Marvel Masterworks: The Amazing Spider-Man Vol. 12 [#110–120]
 Marvel Masterworks: The Amazing Spider-Man Vol. 13 [#121–131]
 Marvel Masterworks: The Amazing Spider-Man Vol. 14 [#132–142; Giant-Size Super-Heroes #1]
 Marvel Masterworks: The Amazing Spider-Man Vol. 15 [#143–155; Marvel Special Edition Treasury #1]
 Marvel Masterworks: The Amazing Spider-Man Vol. 16 [#156–168; Annual #10]
 Marvel Masterworks: The Amazing Spider-Man Vol. 17 [#169–180; Annual #11; Nova #12; Marvel Treasury Edition #14]
 Marvel Masterworks: The Amazing Spider-Man Vol. 18 [#181–192; Mighty Marvel Comics Calendar 1978; material From Annual #12]
 Marvel Masterworks: The Amazing Spider-Man Vol. 19 [#193–202; Annual #13; Peter Parker, the Spectacular Spider-Man Annual #1]
 Marvel Masterworks: The Amazing Spider-Man Vol. 20 [#203–212; Annual #14]
 Marvel Masterworks: The Amazing Spider-Man Vol. 21 [#213–223; Annual #15]
 Amazing Spider-Man Vol. 1: (The) Parker Luck [Vol. 3 #1–6 (i.e., legacy #732–737)]
 Amazing Spider-Man Vol. 2: Spider-Verse Prelude [#7–8 (i.e., legacy #738–739); Superior Spider-Man #32–33; Free Comic Book Day 2014 (Guardians of the Galaxy) #1]
 Amazing Spider-Man Vol. 3: Spider-Verse [#9–15 (i.e., legacy #740–746)]
 Amazing Spider-Man Vol. 4: Graveyard Shift [#16–18 (i.e., legacy #747–749); Annual 2015]
 Amazing Spider-Man Vol. 5: Spiral [#16.1–20.1(i.e., legacy #750–751)]
 Amazing Spider-Man: Renew Your Vows [#1–5 (i.e., legacy #752–756)]
 Amazing Spider-Man Worldwide Vol. 1 [Vol. 4 #1–5]
 Amazing Spider-Man Worldwide Vol. 2 [#6–11]
 Amazing Spider-Man Worldwide Vol. 3 [#12–15]
 Amazing Spider-Man Worldwide Vol. 4 [#16–19]
 Amazing Spider-Man Worldwide Vol. 5 [#20–24, Annual #1]
 Amazing Spider-Man Worldwide Vol. 6 [#25–28]
 Amazing Spider-Man Worldwide Vol. 7 [#29–32 (i.e., legacy #785–788), #789–791]
 Amazing Spider-Man: Venom Inc. [Venom Inc. Alpha, Venom Inc. Omega, #792–793, Venom #159–160] 
 Amazing Spider-Man Worldwide Vol. 8 [#794–796, Annual]
 Amazing Spider-Man Worldwide Vol. 9 [#797–801]
 Amazing Spider-Man: Clone Conspiracy [#19-24; The Clone Conspiracy #1-5; The Clone Conspiracy: Omega; Silk #14-17; Prowler #1-5]
 Amazing Spider-Man: Red Goblin [#794–801]
 Amazing Spider-Man Vol. 1: Back to Basics [#1–5, FCBD 2018: Amazing Spider-Man]
 Amazing Spider-Man Vol. 2: Friends and Foes [#6–10]
 Amazing Spider-Man Vol. 3: Lifetime Achievement [#11–15]
 Amazing Spider-Man Vol. 4: Hunted [#16–23, #16.1, #18.1–20.1]
 Amazing Spider-Man Vol. 5: Behind the Scenes [#24–28]
 Amazing Spider-Man Vol. 6: Absolute Carnage [#29–31]
 Amazing Spider-Man Vol. 7: 2099 [#32–36]
 Amazing Spider-Man Vol. 8: Threats & Menaces [#37–43]
 Amazing Spider-Man Vol. 9: Sins Rising [#44–47, Amazing Spider Man: Sins Rising #1]
 Amazing Spider-Man Vol. 10: Green Goblin Returns [#48–49, Amazing Spider-Man: The Sins of Norman Osborn #1, FCBD 2020: Spider-Man/Venom]
 Amazing Spider-Man Vol. 11: Last Remains [#50–55]
Amazing Spider-Man: Last Remains Companion [#50.1–54.1]
Amazing Spider-Man Vol. 12: Shattered Web [#56–60]
Amazing Spider-Man Vol. 13: King's Ransom [#61–65, Giant Size Amazing Spider-Man: King's Ransom #1]
Amazing Spider-Man Vol. 14: Chameleon Conspiracy [#66–69, Giant Size Amazing Spider-Man: Chameleon Conspiracy #1]
Amazing Spider-Man Vol. 15: What Cost Victory? [#70–74]
Amazing Spider-Man: Beyond Vol. 1 [#75–80, 78.BEY]
Amazing Spider-Man: Beyond Vol. 2 [#81-85, 80.BEY]
Amazing Spider-Man: Beyond Vol. 3 [#86-88, 88.BEY]
Amazing Spider-Man: Beyond Vol. 4 [#89-93, 92.BEY]
Amazing Spider-Man Vol. 1: World Without Love [#1-5]
Amazing Spider-Man Vol. 2: The New Sinister [#6-8]
Amazing Spider-Man Vol. 3: Hobgoblin [#9-14]
Amazing Spider-Man Vol. 4: Dark Web [#15-18, Dark Web #1, Dark Web: Omega #1]

See also

References

External links
 
 
 The Amazing Spider-Man comic book sales figures from 1966–present at The Comics Chronicles
 Spider-Man at Marvel Comics wikia
 The Amazing Spider-Man cover gallery
 Spiderman Videos

1963 comics debuts
Comics by Archie Goodwin (comics)
Comics by Dennis O'Neil
Comics by Gerry Conway
Comics by J. M. DeMatteis
Comics by J. Michael Straczynski
Comics by John Byrne (comics)
Comics by Len Wein
Comics by Mark Waid
Comics by Marv Wolfman
Comics by Roger Stern
Comics by Stan Lee
Comics by Steve Ditko
Spider-Man titles